H.D. Premaratne (born 1944) was educated at Gurukula Vidyalaya in Kelaniya. He started his film career as a clapper boy in Daru Duka in 1967.  While working at the old Times of Ceylon group, he was an Assistant Director for Pujithayo before embarking on his maiden directorial venture Sikuruliya starring Vijaya Kumaranatunga  and Swineetha Weerasinghe in 1975.

A majority of his work focused on women and women's issues.  
Along with cinema, Premaratne produced the teledramas Sandungira Ginigani (1993), Sihina Danauwa (1996), and Dulari (1997)  and also the stage drama Yakage Kammala.
He worked at Swarnavahini as a Consultant to the Board of Directors, and functioned as the president of the Sri Lanka Cinema Bala Mandalaya.

Filmography

Awards
 1993 Presidential Awards
 Best Script Writer, Saptha Kanya
 1985 Sarasaviya Awards
 Best Script Writer, Dewani Gamana
 1991 Sarasaviya Awards
 Best Director, Palama Yata
 Best Script Writer, Palama Yata – 1991
 1993 Sarasaviya Awards
 Best Director, Kula Geya

References

1944 births
2005 deaths
Sri Lankan film directors